The Fix is a 1997 television film directed by Paul Greengrass that was first shown on BBC One and starring Jason Isaacs and Steve Coogan

Plot
It tells the story of the British betting scandal of 1964, following which a number of British professional footballers were jailed and banned from football for life for conspiring to fix the results of matches. Prominent among those gaoled and banned were the Sheffield Wednesday F.C. stars Peter Swan, Tony Kay and David Layne.

The part of Mike Gabbert – the Sunday People journalist who led the investigation into the scandal – was played by Steve Coogan. Jason Isaacs played the part of Tony Kay, through whose eyes the story is largely told, while the part of Jimmy Gauld – the ex-footballer who masterminded the betting ring – was played by Christopher Fulford.

The story centres on Gabbert building his exclusive during the latter stages of the 1962/63 season, a time when Kay is becoming known as one of the best players in the game, having joined Everton, with whom he wins the League title.

Although the film is based on fact, some details and characters were fictionalised.

Cast
 Steve Coogan as Mike Gabbert
 Jason Isaacs as Tony Kay
 Maggie O'Neill as Marina Kay
 Christopher Fulford as Jimmy Gauld
 Ricky Tomlinson as Gordon
 Colin Welland as Harry Catterick
 Michael Elphick as Peter Campling
 Chris Walker as David 'Bronco' Layne

External links 
 

1997 television films
1997 films
British television films
British historical films
British association football films
Sports films based on actual events
Films directed by Paul Greengrass
Films set in 1962
Films set in 1963
Films set in 1964
1990s English-language films
1990s British films